Many Worlds Are Born Tonight (1998) is the tenth album by American singer-songwriter Happy Rhodes.

Overview

Rhodes' first album on a larger independent label (Samson Music), leading to the All-Music Guide reviewer mistakenly describing this as her debut album.

"Roy (Back from the Offworld)" is the only Happy Rhodes track to have ever charted thus far (August 2007) - peaking at #42 on the Billboard Hot Dance/Club Play chart. [ 1]

Track listing

All music, lyrics, voices, arrangements, sequencing, programming, sampling - Happy Rhodes (unless otherwise noted in album credits)

 "100 Years" - 5:25
 "Many Worlds Are Born Tonight" - 4:52
 "The Chariot" - 5:22
 "Ra Is a Busy God" - 6:21
 "If Wishes Were Horses, How Beggars Would Ride" - 5:02
 "Roy (Back from the Offworld)" - 5:33
 "Tragic" - 6:09
 "Proof" - 4:22
 "Looking Over Cliffs" - 4:57
 "Winter" - 3:58
 "Serenading Genius" - 6:37
 "How It Should Be" - 4:19 (German CD only)

 Produced by Happy Rhodes.
 Engineered by Happy Rhodes with additional tracking by Kevin Bartlett at Aural Gratification
 All vocals engineered by Kevin Bartlett

Personnel
Happy Rhodes - Nylon String Guitar, 12 String Guitar, Hand Percussion
Kevin Bartlett - Harmonic, Shadow and Original E-bow, Bass, Bass Loops, Drippy Bass, Hand Percussion, Jug, Vase, Linguini Grill, Log Drums, Bongos, Mini Djembe, Chime
Jerry Marotta - Drums, Barney Rubble Drums, Nails of Goat and "Oh"
Carl Adami - Bass, Bass Loopie Things
Rob Taylor - Violin
Kelly Bird, Mitch Elrod - Additional Voices on "Proof"

Samples

Peter Siedlaczeks' Classical Choir
David Torn's Tonal Textures #22
Gota Yashiki's Groove Activator
Project Lo's Dabblings In Darkness, "Three Rivers Of Lor"
David Torn's Tonal Textures #6,
Rich Goodhart's Never Give A Sword To A Man Who Can't Dance, "Ritual Dreaming" Copyright 1995
SSS Laidback Drumtools
Big Fish Audio's Loopalicious and Drum Looks 3
Trevor Rabin's Can't Look Away "Something To Hold On To" Copyright 1989
"Warrior Songs" - Purchased on the streets of N.Y.C from an American Indian...
Rarefaction's A Poke In The Ear With A Sharp Stick ...Voice.
David Torn's Tonal Textures, #'s 20, 23 and 27

1998 albums
Happy Rhodes albums